Glenognatha foxi is a species of long-jawed orb weaver in the spider family Tetragnathidae. It is found in a range from Canada to Panama.

References

Tetragnathidae
Articles created by Qbugbot
Spiders described in 1894